Gyula Toth (30 April 1941 – 1 March 2014) was a Yugoslav football coach and player. He spent four seasons in the Bundesliga with FC Schalke 04 and 1. FC Nürnberg. He died as a result of Parkinson's disease.

Honours
1. FC Nürnberg
 Bundesliga: 1967–68

References

External links
 

1941 births
2014 deaths
Sportspeople from Kikinda
Yugoslav footballers
Yugoslav football managers
KSV Hessen Kassel managers
SpVgg Greuther Fürth players
FC Schalke 04 players
1. FC Nürnberg players
SSV Jahn Regensburg players
FC 08 Homburg players
Bundesliga players
Association football goalkeepers
Neurological disease deaths in Serbia
Deaths from Parkinson's disease